Paul de Rémusat (17 November 1831, Paris22 January 1897, Paris), son of the French politician Charles de Rémusat, became a distinguished journalist and writer.

He was for many years a regular contributor to the Revue des deux Mondes. He stood for election in Haute-Garonne in 1869 in opposition to the imperial policy and failed, but was elected to the National Assembly in 1871 and later. In 1890 he entered the Académie des Sciences Morales et Politiques.

References

External links
 
 

1831 births
1897 deaths
Writers from Paris
Members of the Académie des sciences morales et politiques
19th-century French journalists
French male journalists
French male writers
19th-century French male writers
Senators of Haute-Garonne